First Lady or First Gentleman of Gabon is the title held by the spouse of the president of Gabon. The current first lady is Sylvia Bongo Ondimba, who has held the office since 2009.

First ladies of Gabon

References

Politics of Gabon
Presidents of Gabon
Gabon politics-related lists
Gabon